= South Hill, Lexington =

Neighborhood in Lexington, Kentucky

Coordinates: 38.044°N 84.503°W

South Hill is a neighborhood and historic district located immediately south of downtown Lexington, Kentucky, United States. Its boundaries are South Limestone Street to the east, Pine Street to the south, South Broadway to the west, and High Street to the north.

Neighborhood statistics

- Area: 0.079 square miles (0.20 km^{2})
- Population: 466
- Population density: 5,916 people per square mile
- Median age: 26.9
- Median household income: $29,332
